Antonio Lukanović (born 6 March 1998) is a Croatian football player who plays as a forward for Italian 5th tier-outfit Bassano 1903.

Club career
He made his professional debut in the Serie B for Novara on 4 September 2016 in a game against Pisa. In 2020 he joined Montebelluna and he moved to Campodarsego in 2021. He signed up with at the last day of 2021.

References

External links
 
 
 Italian career stats - Tuttocampo

1998 births
Living people
Footballers from Rijeka
Association football forwards
Croatian footballers
Novara F.C. players
U.S. Catanzaro 1929 players
NK Olimpija Ljubljana (2005) players
Calcio Montebelluna players
A.C.D. Campodarsego players
Serie B players
Serie C players
Slovenian PrvaLiga players
Slovenian Second League players
Serie D players
Eccellenza players
Croatian expatriate footballers
Expatriate footballers in Italy
Croatian expatriate sportspeople in Italy
Expatriate footballers in Slovenia
Croatian expatriate sportspeople in Slovenia